Novoselë is a village and a former municipality in the Vlorë County, southwestern Albania. At the 2015 local government reform it became a subdivision of the municipality Vlorë. The population at the 2011 census was 8,209.

The village formerly had a railway station, which closed in 1997.

Villages

The municipal unit consists of the villages Novoselë, Aliban, Bishan, Mifol, Poro, Dëllënjë, Delisuf, Trevllazër, Cerkovinë, Skrofotinë, Fitore and Akërni. The region is populated by ethnic Albanians mainly orthodox of Myzeqar subgroup.

References 

Former municipalities in Vlorë County
Administrative units of Vlorë
Villages in Vlorë County